Bangladesh Textile Mills Corporation, or BTMC, is a public corporation that owns and manages all government textile mills in Bangladesh and is located in Dhaka. It manages 18 government owned textile factories.

History
The corporation was established on 26 March 1972 through the nationalization of textile mills in Bangladesh. It owns Eagle Textile in Chittagong. The Ministry for Textiles and Jute is responsible for running the corporation. The corporation has the largest liability of any state owned enterprise in Bangladesh with 76.54 billion taka in loans. Nearly 99% of its loans are in default. Rangamati Textile Mill is also owned by the corporation. It used to manage 86 government owned textile mills which has been reduced to the 18 today.

References

1972 establishments in Bangladesh
Government-owned companies of Bangladesh
Manufacturing companies based in Dhaka
Textile companies of Bangladesh